Giorgio Lucenti (born 19 September 1975) is a retired Italian football player, and current coach. He is currently contracted with Juve Stabia as a technical collaborator.

Playing career
Born in Ragusa, Sicily, Giorgio and his brother Gaetano started his career at Ragusa. He then signed by Palermo. In summer 1997, he was transferred to A.S. Roma, but in January 1998 left for Serie A side Empoli. In July 1999, he joined Napoli in co-ownership deal, for 1.2 billion Italian lire, but bought back for 0.99 billion lire in June 2000. In summer 2000, he was sold to Cagliari in co-ownership deal for a nominal amount of 1 million lire. He played 31 league matches in the first season. In June 2001, Cagliari bought the remain registration rights for 8 billion lire (about €4million, and as part of Jonathan Zebina's debt). He was the regular for Cagliari in the Serie B campaign, but in 2003 sold to league rival Piacenza.

In 2005, he returned to Sicily, but for Catania. He won promotion to Serie A in 2006 with team. In 2006–07 season, he played 16 starts in 24 league appearances.

In July 2007, he joined Mantova in 2-year deal. But in January 2008, he left for Frosinone. In July 2009, he signed a 2-year contract with Lega Pro Prima Divisione side Potenza.

Coaching career
In 2019, Lucenti joined Juve Stabia as a youth coach, being successively promoted as a coaching staff member and technical collaborator under Walter Novellino and Leonardo Colucci. Following the resignation of Colucci, Lucenti was temporarily appointed as interim head coach, overseeing a 1–0 away win against Viterbese.

References

External links
 Profile at La Gazzetta dello Sport 2006-07 
 Profile at La Gazzetta dello Sport 2007-08 
 
 Profile at AIC.Football.it 
 

Italian footballers
Serie A players
Serie B players
Palermo F.C. players
A.S. Roma players
Empoli F.C. players
Cagliari Calcio players
Piacenza Calcio 1919 players
Catania S.S.D. players
Mantova 1911 players
Frosinone Calcio players
Potenza S.C. players
Association football midfielders
People from Ragusa, Sicily
1975 births
Living people
Footballers from Sicily
Sportspeople from the Province of Ragusa